John Rae (9 January 1813 – 15 July 1900) was an Australian administrator, painter and author.

Early life
John Rae was born at Aberdeen, Scotland, the son of George Rae, banker, and his wife Jane, née Edmond. He was educated at the Aberdeen Grammar School, Marischal College and University of Aberdeen. He graduated Master of Arts in 1832. He studied law and in 1839 went to Australia to take up the position of secretary and accountant to the North British Australasian Loan and Investment Company.

Career as an administrator
He arrived in Sydney on 8 December 1839. In 1842 he was responsible for the letterpress for Sydney Illustrated, and was appointed town clerk of Sydney on 27 July 1843, the second to occupy that position.

At the end of 1853 the Sydney corporation was abolished, and from 1 January 1854 the city was managed by three commissioners, of whom Rae was one. In 1856 John Smith, then mayor of Melbourne, endeavored to have Rae appointed town clerk of Melbourne, but Edmond Gerald Fitzgibbon was chosen for the position.

In April 1857 the city council of Sydney was again constituted, and in July Rae was appointed secretary and accountant to the railway commissioners. In January 1861 he became under-secretary for works and commissioner for railways. In this post, he supported a standard gauge throughout the colonies.

In 1877 Rae gave up the office of commissioner for railways, and in 1888 he became a member of the civil service board. He retired in 1893 at the age of 80.

Artistic and personal life
Upon his arrival in Sydney, he became interested in the Sydney Mechanics' School of Arts; he delivered in connection with it a series of lectures on "Taste" and "The English Language" in 1841.

In August 1844 a fancy dress ball was given by the mayor of Sydney, the first of its kind in Australia. Rae wrote The Mayor's Fancy Ball, a long humorous and satirical poem on this event which was printed anonymously in four issues of The Sydney Morning Herald in April 1845. He married Elizabeth Thompson in the same year.

His first acknowledged publication was The Book of the Prophet Isaiah rendered into English Blank Verse, which was published in 1853.

He published in 1869, Gleanings from my Scrap-Book in two series, collections of his work in verse, which were followed by Gleanings from My ScrapBook: Third Series, dated 1874. This consisted of The Mayor's Fancy Ball already referred to. The three series were printed by the author himself, and are remarkably good examples of amateur printing.

He was also a good amateur painter in water-colours; a series of 26 views of the streets of Sydney are held by the Mitchell Library, Sydney.

At his death in 1900 he was survived by four sons and two daughters.

References

Nan Phillips, "Rae, John (1813 - 1900)", Australian Dictionary of Biography, Melbourne University Press, online edition.

1813 births
1900 deaths
Alumni of the University of Aberdeen
19th-century Australian public servants
Australian landscape painters
Australian book and manuscript collectors